Cardy is a surname. Notable people with the surname include:

Alan Cardy, representative of Australia in rugby union
Dominic Cardy (born 1970), English born Canadian politician
Jennifer Cardy, Irish victim of serial killer Robert Black
John Cardy, British theoretical physicist
Julien Cardy (born 1981), midfielder in the French Football League
Nick Cardy (1920–2013), American comic book artist
Peter Cardy, British activist
Tom Cardy, Australian comedian and musician

See also

Caddy (name)
Cardi, surname
Carry (name)

Cornish-language surnames